Caddel is a surname. Notable people with the surname include:

Ernie Caddel (1911–1992), American football player
Richard Caddel (1949–2003), English poet, publisher, and editor

See also
Caddell